Al-Mahrur is a village in the Hazm Al Udayn District in the Ibb Governorate, Yemen.
There are 1029 residents in the village.

References

Populated places in Ibb Governorate